Tanzee Daniel (born 26 December 1976, San Fernando, Trinidad) is a retired female professional boxer.

In her career, Daniel has fought many credentialed boxers and has fought for the WBC World female heavyweight title.

Professional boxing record

References

1976 births
Living people
Trinidad and Tobago women boxers
Heavyweight boxers
People from San Fernando, Trinidad and Tobago